Gertrude Candiru (born 20 August 1994) is a Ugandan women's cricketer.
In July 2018, she was named in Uganda's squad for the 2018 ICC Women's World Twenty20 Qualifier tournament.

References

External links
 

1994 births
Living people
Ugandan women cricketers
Uganda women Twenty20 International cricketers